The 2013 OEC Taipei WTA Ladies Open also known as 2013 OEC Taipei WTA Challenger was a professional tennis tournament played on indoor carpet courts. It was the sixth edition of the tournament and the last event of the 2013 WTA 125K series. It took place in Taipei, Taiwan, on 4–10 November 2013.

Singles entrants

Seeds 

 1 Rankings as of 28 October 2013

Other entrants 
The following players received wildcards into the singles main draw:
  Chan Yung-jan
  Chan Hao-ching
  Lee Ya-hsuan
  Wang Qiang

The following players received entry from the qualifying draw:
  Ekaterina Bychkova
  Chan Chin-wei
  Lesley Kerkhove
  Valeria Solovyeva

Doubles entrants

Seeds

Other entrants 
The following pair received entry as alternates:
  Anna-Lena Friedsam /  Alison Van Uytvanck

Withdrawals 
Before the tournament
  Ajla Tomljanović (lower back injury)

Champions

Singles 

  Alison Van Uytvanck def.  Yanina Wickmayer 6–4, 6–2

Doubles 

  Caroline Garcia /  Yaroslava Shvedova def.  Anna-Lena Friedsam /  Alison Van Uytvanck 6–3, 6–3

References

External links 
 

2013 WTA 125K series
2013
Carpet court tennis tournaments
2013 in Taiwanese tennis
2013 in Taiwanese women's sport